Cyclocephala melanocephala is a species of beetle in the subfamily Dynastinae. It is found in North and Central America.

References

External links
 Cyclocephala elegans at insectoid.info

Beetles described in 1775
Taxa named by Johan Christian Fabricius
Dynastinae